Gaspar Hoffstetter was a 16th-century politician in Slovenia when the country was under the Holy Roman Empire. He became mayor of Ljubljana in 1574 and in serving a period of eight years became one of the longest serving mayors of the city. It is hard to tell whether he was popular or not, as with the then common lack of records.
He was succeeded by Marko Stetner in 1582.

References

Mayors of places in the Holy Roman Empire
Mayors of Ljubljana
Year of birth missing
Year of death missing
16th-century Slovenian people